Homegoing is an African-American funeral tradition.

Homegoing may also refer to:

Homegoing (Gyasi novel), a 2016 novel by Yaa Gyasi
Homegoing (Pohl novel), a 1989 novel by Frederik Pohl
Homegoings (film), a 2013 documentary film